NGC 822 is an elliptical galaxy in the constellation Phoenix. It is estimated to be about 233 million light-years from the Milky Way and has a diameter of approximately 80,000 light-years. NGC 822 was discovered on September 5, 1834, by astronomer John Herschel.

See also 
 List of NGC objects (1–1000)

References 

Phoenix (constellation)
0822
Elliptical galaxies
008055